United States v. American Trucking Associations, 310 U.S. 534 (1940), was a landmark United States Supreme Court in which the court held the Motor Carrier Act of 1935 did not permit federal agencies to regulate employees whose duties did not affect safety and operation.

Background
The American Trucking Associations (ATA) filed suit to compel the Interstate Commerce Commission (ICC) to regulate all employees of trucking industries, rather than simply those whose job affects safety.  The Fair Labor Standards Act (FLSA) included an exemption to employees regulated by the ICC under the Motor Carrier Act of 1935.  The ATA sought a ruling compelling the ICC to recognize all trucking employees as within its power to regulate, as such employees would then be exempt from the minimum wage and overtime requirements of the FLSA.

Opinion of the Court
The court decided that ICC's interpretation of the statute, which limited its power only to those employees who affect safety, was correct.

See also
List of United States Supreme Court cases, volume 310

References

External links
 
 

1940 in United States case law
United States Supreme Court cases
United States statutory interpretation case law
Interstate Commerce Commission litigation
United States Supreme Court cases of the Hughes Court